Testerman is a surname. Notable people with that name include:

Ben Testerman (born 1962), former professional tennis player from the United States
Don Testerman (born 1952), former professional American football player who played in 4 NFL seasons
Donna Testerman (born 1960), mathematician
Jim Testerman, prominent labor leader in Pennsylvania, where he is president of the Pennsylvania State Education Association
Kyle Testerman (born 1935), mayor of Knoxville, Tennessee from 1972 to 1975, and again from 1984 to 1987
Philip Testerman (born 1927), American politician

See also
Testerian